Edward Tyler was an American Negro league outfielder in the 1920s.

Tyler played for the St. Louis Stars in 1925. In his 33 recorded games, he posted 31 hits and 11 RBI in 97 plate appearances.

References

External links
 and Seamheads

Year of birth missing
Year of death missing
Place of birth missing
Place of death missing
St. Louis Stars (baseball) players